The David di Donatello for Best Score is a film award presented annually by the Accademia del Cinema Italiano (ACI, Academy of Italian Cinema) to recognize outstanding efforts on the part of film music composers who have worked within the Italian film industry during the year preceding the ceremony.
The award has been given every year since 1975, with the exception of the 1979 and 1980 editions.

Ennio Morricone is the record holder in the category.

Winners and nominees
Winners are indicated in bold.

1970s
1975
 Piero Piccioni - Travolti da un insolito destino nell'azzurro mare d'agosto

1976
 Franco Mannino - L'Innocente

1977
 Nino Rota - Il Casanova di Federico Fellini

1978
 Armando Trovajoli - Mogliamante

1980s
1981
 Fiorenzo Carpi - Voltati Eugenio
 Ennio Morricone - Bianco, rosso e Verdone
 Piero Piccioni - Three Brothers
 Riz Ortolani - Help Me Dream

1982
 Lucio Dalla and Fabio Liberatori - Borotalco
 Fiorenzo Carpi - Cercasi Gesù
 Carlo Rustichelli - Forest of Love

1983
 Angelo Branduardi - State buoni se potete
 Nicola Piovani - The Night of the Shooting Stars
 Armando Trovajoli - That Night in Varennes

1984
 Armando Trovajoli and Vladimir Cosna - Ballando ballando
 Gianfranco Plenizio - And the Ship Sails On
 Francesco De Gregori - Flirt

1985
 Carlo Savina - Pizza connection
 Nicola Piovani - Kaos
 Riz Ortolani - The Three of Us

1986
 Riz Ortolani - Festa di laurea (ex aequo)
 Nicola Piovani - Ginger e Fred (ex aequo)
 Armando Trovajoli - Macaroni

1987
 Armando Trovajoli - The Family
 Riz Ortolani - Christmas Present
 Giovanna Marini - A Tale of Love

1988
 Ennio Morricone - Gli occhiali d'oro
 Nicola Piovani - It's Happening Tomorrow
 Francis Lai - Dark Eyes

1989
 Ennio Morricone - Nuovo cinema Paradiso
 Vangelis - Francesco
 Armando Trovajoli - Splendor

1990s
1990
 Claudio Mattone - Scugnizzi
 Mario Nascimbene - Blue Dolphin - L'avventura continua
 Riz Ortolani - The Story of Boys & Girls
 Nicola Piovani - The Voice of the Moon
 Armando Trovajoli - What Time Is It?

1991
 Ennio Morricone - Stanno tutti bene
 Armando Trovajoli - Captain Fracassa's Journey
 Giancarlo Bigazzi and Marco Falagiani - Mediterraneo
 Antonello Venditti - Ultra
 Riz Ortolani - Nel giardino delle rose

1992
 Franco Piersanti - Il ladro di bambini
 Francesco De Gregori - The Rubber Wall
 Pino Daniele - Pensavo fosse amore, invece era un calesse

1993
 Ennio Morricone - Jona che visse nella balena
 Ennio Morricone - The Escort
 Riz Ortolani - Magnificat

1994
 Nicola Piovani - Caro diario
 Federico De Robertis - Sud
 Nicola Piovani - Per amore, solo per amore

1995
 Franco Piersanti - Lamerica
 Luis Bacalov - Il postino
 Pino Donaggio - Un eroe borghese

1996
 Manuel De Sica - Celluloide
 Ennio Morricone - L'uomo delle stelle
 Armando Trovaioli - Il romanzo di un giovane povero

1997
 Paolo Conte - La freccia azzurra
 Luis Bacalov - La tregua
 Carlo Crivelli - Il principe di Homburg
 Federico De Robertis and Mauro Pagani - Nirvana
 Nicola Piovani - La mia generazione

1998
 Nino D'Angelo - Tano da morire
 Franco Piersanti - La parola amore esiste
 Nicola Piovani - La vita è bella

1999
 Ennio Morricone - La leggenda del pianista sull'oceano
 Ludovico Einaudi - Fuori dal mondo
 Luciano Ligabue - Radiofreccia

2000s
2000
 Ennio Morricone - Canone inverso
 Paolo Buonvino - Come te nessuno mai
 Pivio and Aldo De Scalzi - Ormai è fatta

2001
 Nicola Piovani - La stanza del figlio
 Ennio Morricone - Malèna
 Armando Trovajoli - Concorrenza sleale

2002
 Fabio Vacchi - Il mestiere delle armi
 Luciano Ligabue - Da zero a dieci
 Giovanni Venosta - Brucio nel vento

2003
 Andrea Guerra - La finestra di fronte
 Banda Osiris - L'imbalsamatore
 Pivio and Aldo De Scalzi - Casomai
 Riz Ortolani - Il cuore altrove
 Nicola Piovani - Pinocchio

2004
 Banda Osiris - Primo amore
 Ezio Bosso - Io non ho paura
 Andrea Guerra - Che ne sarà di noi
 Riz Ortolani - La rivincita di Natale
 Giovanni Venosta - Agata e la tempesta

2005
 Riz Ortolani - Ma quando arrivano le ragazze?
 Paolo Buonvino - Manuale d'amore
 Pasquale Catalano - Le conseguenze dell'amore
 Andrea Guerra - Cuore sacro
 Franco Piersanti - Le chiavi di casa

2006
 Franco Piersanti - Il caimano
 Goran Bregović - I giorni dell'abbandono
 Paolo Buonvino - Romanzo criminale
 Negramaro (Fabio Barovero, Simone Fabroni, Roy Paci, Louis Siciliano) - La febbre
 Bruno Zambrini - Notte prima degli esami

2007
 Ennio Morricone - La sconosciuta
 Teho Teardo - L'amico di famiglia
 Neffa - Saturno contro
 Franco Piersanti - Mio fratello è figlio unico
 Fabio Vacchi - Centochiodi

2008
 Paolo Buonvino - Caos calmo
 Lele Marchitelli - Piano, solo
 Fausto Mesolella - Lascia perdere, Johnny!
 Teho Teardo - La ragazza del lago
 Giovanni Venosta - Giorni e nuvole

2009
 Teho Teardo - Il Divo
 Bruno Zambrini - Ex
 Baustelle - Giulia non esce la sera
 Paolo Buonvino - Italians
 Pivio and Aldo De Scalzi - Si può fare

2010s
2010
 Ennio Morricone - Baarìa
 Marco Biscarini and Daniele Furlati - L'uomo che verrà
 Carlo Virzì - La prima cosa bella
 Pasquale Catalano - Mine vaganti
 Carlo Crivelli - Vincere

2011
 Rita Marcotulli and Rocco Papaleo - Basilicata coast to coast
 Umberto Scipione - Benvenuti al Sud
 Teho Teardo - Il gioiellino
 Fausto Mesolella - Into Paradiso
 Hubert Westkemper - Noi credevamo

2012
 David Byrne - This Must Be the Place
 Umberto Scipione - Benvenuti al Nord
 Giuliano Taviani and Carmelo Travia - Cesare deve morire 
 Franco Piersanti - Habemus Papam
 Pasquale Catalano - Magnifica presenza

2013
 Ennio Morricone - La migliore offerta
 Alexandre Desplat - Reality
 Mauro Pagani - Educazione siberiana
 Franco Piersanti - Io e Te
 Teho Teardo - Diaz - Don't Clean Up This Blood

2014
 Pivio and Aldo De Scalzi - Song'e Napule
 Pasquale Catalano - Allaciati le Cinture
 Lele Marchitelli - La Grande Bellezza
 Umberto Scipione - Sotto una Buona Stella
 Carlo Virzì - Il Capitale Umano

2015
 Giuliano Taviani - Anime nere
 Nicola Piovani - Hungry Hearts
 Sascha Ring - Il giovane favoloso
 Ezio Bosso, Federico De Robertis - Il ragazzo invisibile
 Paolo Fresu - Torneranno i prati

2016
 David Lang - Youth
 Alexandre Desplat - Tale of Tales
 Ennio Morricone - The Correspondence
 Michele Braga, Gabriele Mainetti - They Call Me Jeeg
 Paolo Vivaldi and Alessandro Sartini - Don't Be Bad

2017
 Enzo Avitabile - Indivisibile
 Carlo Crivelli - Sweet Dreams (2016 film)
 Carlo Virzì - Like Crazy
 Franco Piersanti - La stoffa dei sogni
 Andrea Farri - Italian Race

2018
 Pivio and Aldo De Scalzi - Ammore e malavita
 Antonio Fresa, Luigi Scialdone - Cinderella the Cat
 Franco Piersanti - Tenderness
 Pasquale Catalano - Napoli velata
 Gatto Ciliegia contro il Grande Freddo - Nico, 1988

2019
 Sascha Ring and Philipp Thimm - Capri-Revolution
 Nicola Piovani - A casa tutti bene
 Nicola Tescari - Euphoria
 Lele Marchitelli - Loro
 Mokadelic - On My Skin

2020s
2020
 Orchestra di Piazza Vittorio - Il flauto magico di piazza Vittorio
 Andrea Farri - The First King: Birth of an Empire
 Nicola Piovani - The Traitor
 Dario Marianelli - Pinocchio
 Thom Yorke - Suspiria

See also
 Nastro d'Argento for Best Score
 Cinema of Italy

References

External links
 
 David di Donatello official website

David di Donatello
Film awards for best score